The tale of the founding of Rome is recounted in traditional stories handed down by the ancient Romans themselves as the earliest history of their city in terms of legend and myth. The most familiar of these myths, and perhaps the most famous of all Roman myths, is the story of Romulus and Remus, twins who were suckled by a she-wolf as infants. Another account, set earlier in time, claims that the Roman people are descended from Trojan War hero Aeneas, who escaped to Italy after the war, and whose son, Iulus, was the ancestor of the family of Julius Caesar.  The archaeological evidence of human occupation of the area of modern-day Rome dates from about 14,000 years ago.

Founding myths and sources

Aeneas

The national epic of mythical Rome, the Aeneid of Virgil, tells the story of how Trojan prince Aeneas came to Italy. The Aeneid was written under Augustus, who claimed ancestry through Julius Caesar to Aeneas and his mother Venus. According to the Aeneid, the survivors from the fallen city of Troy banded together under Aeneas and underwent a series of adventures around the Mediterranean Sea, including a stop at newly founded Carthage under the rule of Queen Dido, eventually reaching the Italian coast. The Trojans were thought to have landed in an area between modern Anzio and Fiumicino, southwest of Rome, probably at Laurentum or, in other versions, at Lavinium, a place named for Lavinia, the daughter of King Latinus. King Latinus agreed that Lavinia marry Aeneas. This started a series of armed conflicts with Turnus over the marriage of Lavinia. Before the arrival of Aeneas, Turnus was betrothed to Lavinia, who was then promised to Aeneas, starting the war. Aeneas won the war and killed Turnus. The Trojans won the right to stay and to assimilate with the local peoples. The young son of Aeneas, Ascanius, also known as Iulus, went on to found Alba Longa and the line of Alban kings who filled the chronological gap between the Trojan saga and the traditional founding of Rome in the 8th century BC.

Toward the end of this line, King Procas was the father of Numitor and Amulius. At Procas' death, Numitor became king of Alba Longa, but Amulius captured him and sent him to prison; he also forced Numitor's daughter Rhea Silvia to become a virgin priestess among the Vestals.

Evander goes on to explain that from that "first time" the god Saturn brings these scattered people laws and bestows upon them the name Latium.

Sallust writes that Aeneas and his men founded the city, then Aborigines came to the city and later other tribes also came to live there.

Romulus and Remus

The myth of Aeneas was of Greek origin and had to be reconciled with the Italian myth of Romulus and Remus. They were purported to be sons of Rhea Silvia and either Mars, the god of war, or the demigod hero Hercules. They were abandoned at birth, in the manner of many mythological heroes, because of a prophecy that they would overthrow their great-uncle Amulius, who had overthrown Silvia's father Numitor. The twins were abandoned on the river Tiber by servants who took pity on the infants, despite their orders. The twins were nurtured by a she-wolf until a shepherd named Faustulus found the boys and took them as his sons. Faustulus and his wife Acca Larentia raised the children. When Remus and Romulus became adults, they killed Amulius and restored Numitor. They decided to establish a city. Each of them took auspices, then quarelled over the result.  Romulus and his followers began to establish city walls on his favoured hill, the Palatine. Remus wanted to found the city on the Aventine Hill. In the commonest version, according to Livy, Remus slighted Romulus' wall by leaping over it, and was killed, either by his twin or followers. Thus, Rome began with divisions and a fratricide, a story that was later taken to represent the city's history of internecine political strife and bloodshed.

Strabo
Strabo writes that there is also an older story, about the founding of Rome, than the previous legends that he had mentioned. The city was an Arcadian colony and was founded by Evander. Strabo also writes that Lucius Coelius Antipater believed that Rome was founded by Greeks.

Hellanicus of Lesbos and  Damastes of Sigeum
Hellanicus of Lesbos wrote that Rome was founded by the heroes Aeneas and Odysseus who came together there. Other ancient historians, including Damastes of Sigeum, agreed with him.

Dionysius of Halicarnassus
Dionysius of Halicarnassus writes that the people who came to the lands that later became the city of Rome were first the Aborigines, who drove the Sicels out of these lands, and were from the Arcadia, then the Pelasgians, who came from Thessaly. Third came those who accompanied Evander into Italy from the city of Pallantium in Arcadia; next the Epeans from Elis and Pheneats from Pheneus, who were part of the army commanded by Heracles which decided to stay there while they were returning from the expedition at the Erytheia, with whom a Trojan element also was commingled. Last of all came Trojans who had escaped with Aeneas from Ilium, Dardanus, and the other Trojan cities. Dionysius mentions that the Trojans were also Greek people who were originally from the Peloponnesus. He also adds that even Romans say that the Pallantium was founded by Greeks from Pallantium of Arcadia, about sixty years before the Trojan War and the leader was Evander.

Later at the sixteenth generation after the Trojan War the Albans united these places into one settlement, surrounding them with a wall and a ditch. The Albans were a mixed nation composed of all the above people. Dionysius adds that it is possible that a barbarian element from among the neighboring people or a remnant of the ancient inhabitants of the place were mixed with the Greek. But all these people, having lost their tribal past came to be called by one common name, Latins, after Latinus, who had been the king of the country. The leaders of the colony were the twin brothers Romulus and Remus.

Dionysius also mention that many other historians say that Aeneas came into Italy from the land of the Molossians with Odysseus and founded the city. And he named the city Rome after a Trojan woman who persuaded the other women to set fire to the ships because they didn't want to weary anymore.

Diodorus Siculus
Diodorus Siculus wrote that some historians believe that the Romulus who was the son of the daughter of Aeneas was the founder of Rome.
But he did not believe this, and backed up his disbelief with the fact that there were many kings in the period between Aeneas and Romulus, and the city was founded in the second year of the Seventh Olympiad, and the date of this founding falls after the Trojan War by four hundred and thirty-three years.

Virgil and Ovid
Virgil also mentions Evander as the founder of Rome.

Ovid writes that when Evander came from Arcadia to the place where Rome was later built, there were only some trees, a few sheep and some cottages. Evander then taught the natives his gods and sacred rites.

Solinus
Solinus writes that the Arcadians were the founders of the Palatine Hill and the Pallantium. 

He also mentions, that there are different stories of why it is named Rome. One version is that when Evander with his people came, there was already a small town built and the youths called it in Latin “Valentia” and he called it in Greek “Rome”. 
Another version is that after the Trojan war, some Argives came and a captive noble woman named Roma persuaded them to burn their ships. They set up a base, built walls and named the town “Rome” after her. 
Agathocles though writes that it was named after the daughter of Ascanius, granddaughter of Aeneas.

Plutarch
Plutarch writes that "some say that the Pelasgians" founded the city and that they called it Rome because of "their strength in war". While "others say" that after Troy fell, some of its people came to Italy and a noble woman, who was called Roma, proposed to burn the ships and live there, so they named the city after her.

Eusebius
Eusebius in his Chronicon (Eusebius) describe all the different stories about the founding of Rome from many different authors.

Romos
Another story told how Romos, a son of Odysseus and Circe, was the one who founded Rome. Martin P. Nilsson speculates that this older story was becoming a bit embarrassing as Rome became more powerful and tensions with the Greeks grew. Being descendants of the Greeks was no longer preferable, so the Romans settled on the Trojan foundation myth instead. Nilsson further speculates that the name of Romos was changed by the Romans to the native name Romulus, but the name Romos (later changed to the native Remus) was never forgotten by the people, and so these two names came to stand side by side as founders of the city.

Xenagoras writes that Odysseus and Circe had three sons Rhomos, Anteias and Ardeias, who built three cities and called them after their own names (Rome, Anteia and Ardea).

Other myths

Emperor Julian in his satire called "The Caesars", which describes a contest between the previous Roman emperors with Alexander the Great called in as an extra contestant in the presence of the assembled gods, made Alexander say: "I am aware that you Romans are yourselves descended from the Greeks,..."

Date
The ancient Romans were certain of the day Rome was founded: April 21, the day of the festival sacred to Pales, goddess of shepherds, on which date they celebrated the Par ilia (or Palilia). However, they did not know, or they were uncertain of, the exact year the city had been founded; this is one reason they preferred to date their years by the presiding consuls rather than using the formula A.U.C. or Ab urbe condita. Several dates had been proposed by ancient authorities, and Dionysius of Halicarnassus records these: The Greek historian Timaeus, one of the first to write a history to include the Romans, stated that Rome was founded in the 38th year prior to the first Olympiad, or 814/3 BC; Quintus Fabius Pictor, the first Roman to write the history of his people, in Greek, stated Rome was founded in the first year of the eighth Olympiad, or 748/7 BC; Lucius Cincius Alimentus claimed Rome was founded in the fourth year of the twelfth Olympiad, or 729/8 BC; and Cato the Elder calculated that Rome was founded 432 years after the Trojan War, which Dionysius states was equivalent to the first year of the seventh Olympiad, or 752/1 BC. Dionysius himself provided calculations showing that Rome was founded in 751 BC, starting with the Battle of the Allia, which he dated to the first year of the ninety-eighth Olympiad, 388/7 BC, then added 120 years to reach the date of the first consuls, Junius Brutus and Tarquinius Collatinus, 508/7 BC, then added the combined total of the reigns of the Kings of Rome (244 years) to arrive at his own date, 751 BC. Even the official Fasti Capitolini offers its own date, 752 BC.

The most familiar date given for the foundation of Rome, 753 BC, was derived by the Roman antiquarian Titus Pomponius Atticus, and adopted by Marcus Terentius Varro, having become part of what has come to be known as the Varronian chronology. An anecdote in Plutarch where the astrologer Lucius Tarrutius of Firmum provides an argument based on a non-existent eclipse and other erroneous astronomical details that Rome was founded in 753 BC suggests that this had become the most commonly accepted date. Through its use by the third-century writer Censorinus, whose De Die Natali was the ultimate influence of Joseph Justus Scaliger's work to establish a scientific basis of ancient chronology, it became familiar.

Discoveries by Andrea Carandini on Rome's Palatine Hill have also yielded evidence of a series of fortification walls on the north slope that can be dated to the middle of the 8th century BC. According to the legend, Romulus ploughed a furrow (sulcus) around the hill in order to mark the boundary of his new city.

The name of Rome

There is no consensus on the etymology of the city's name. Jean-Jacques Rousseau (1712–1778) suggested Greek "", meaning "strength, vigor".  A modern theory of etymology holds that the name of the city is of Etruscan origin (and perhaps the city itself, though this cannot be proven), derived from rumon, "river".

Archaeology 

There is archaeological evidence of human occupation of the Rome area from about 14,000 years ago, but the dense layer of much younger debris obscures Palaeolithic and Neolithic sites. Several excavations support the view that Rome grew from pastoral settlements on the Palatine Hill built above the area of the future Roman Forum. Between the end of the Bronze Age and the beginning of the Iron Age, each hill between the sea and the Capitol was topped by a village (on the Capitol Hill, a village is attested since the end of the 14th century BC).

In any case, the location that became the city of Rome was inhabited by Latin settlers from various regions, farmers and pastoralists, as evidenced by differences in pottery and burial techniques. The historical Latins were originally an Italic tribe who inhabited, from around 1000 BC, the Alban Hills. They later moved down into the valleys, which provided better land for agriculture. The island Isola Tiberina was the site of an important ancient ford. The area around the Tiber was particularly advantageous and offered notable strategic resources: the river was a natural border on one side, and the hills could provide a safe defensive position on the other side. This position would also have enabled the Latins to control the river and the commercial and military traffic on it from the natural observation point at Isola Tiberina. Moreover, road traffic could be controlled, since Rome was at the intersection of the principal roads to the sea coming from Sabinum (in the northeast) and Etruria (to the northwest).

There is a wide consensus that the city developed gradually through the aggregation (synoecism) of several villages around the largest one on the Palatine. This aggregation, signalling the transition from a proto-urban to an urban settlement, was made possible by the increase in agricultural productivity above the subsistence level: in turn, these boosted the development of trade with the Greek colonies of southern Italy (mainly Ischia and Cumae). All these events, which according to the archaeological excavations occurred around the mid 8th century BC, can be considered as the origin of the city.

Recent studies suggest that the Quirinal hill was very important in ancient times, although the first hill to be inhabited seems to have been the Palatine (thus confirming the legend), which is also at the centre of ancient Rome. Its three peaks, the minor hills Cermalus or Germalus, Palatium, and Velia, were united with the three peaks of the Esquiline (Cispius, Fagutal, and Oppius), and then villages on the Caelian Hill and Suburra.

Recent discoveries revealed that the Germalus on the northern part of the Palatine was the site of a village (dated to the 9th century BC) with circular or elliptical dwellings. It was protected by a clay wall (perhaps reinforced with wood), and it is likely that this is the particular location on the Palatine hill where Rome was actually founded.

Festivals for the Septimontium (literally "of the seven hills") on December 11 were previously considered to be related to the foundation of Rome. However, April 21 is the only date for Rome's foundation upon which all the legends agree, and it has recently been argued that Septimontium celebrated the first federations among Roman hills.

Later commemoration
During the Italian Renaissance, a group of humanists affiliated with the Roman Academy formed a sodality to pursue antiquarian interests, celebrating the "birthday of Rome" annually on April 20. In 1468, the Academy was suppressed by Pope Paul II for fomenting "republicanism, paganism, and conspiracy", but the sodality was reinstated about ten years later under Sixtus IV as the Societas Literatorum S. Victoris in Esquiliis ("Literary Society of Saint Victor on the Esquiline"). The reformed group placed itself under the new patronage of saints Victor, Fortunatus, and Genesius, "whose feast day was conveniently proven to coincide with the Palilia". Their "Palilia" was organized by Pomponio Leto and featured speeches, a communal meal, and a poetry competition.

References

Further reading
 Coarelli, F. 1974. Guida archeologica di Roma. 1. ed. Varia Grandi opere. [Milano]: A. Mondadori.
 Caradini, Andrea. 2011. Rome: Day One. Princeton: Princeton University Press.
 Forsythe, Gary. 2005. A Critical History of Early Rome: From Prehistory to the First Punic War. Berkeley: University of California Press.
 Fromentin, Valérie  and Sophie Gotteland, ed. 2001. Origines Gentium, Collection Etudes 7.   Bordeaux:  Editions Ausonius. 
 Lintott, Andrew. 2010. The Romans in the Age of Augustus. The Peoples of Europe.   Chichester/Malden, MA:  Wiley-Blackwell. 
 Raaflaub, Kurt A, and Tim Cornell. 1986. Social Struggles In Archaic Rome : New Perspectives On the Conflict of the Orders. Berkeley: University of California Press.
 Schultze, C. E. 1995. "Dionysius of Halicarnassus and Roman Chronology." Cambridge Classical Journal 41:192–214.
 Serres, Michel. 1991. Rome: The Book of Foundations. Trans. Felicia McCarren. Stanford: Stanford University Press.
 Slayman, Andrew. 2007. "Fact or Legend? Debate Over the Origins of Rome – Were Romulus and Remus Historical Figures?." Archaeology 60.4:22–27.
 Wiseman, T.P. 1995. Remus: A Roman Myth. Cambridge: Cambridge University Press.
 Wiseman, T. P. 2004. The Myths of Rome.   Exeter:  University of Exeter Press.

External links

History of Rome by Theodor Mommsen

Wolves
Creation myths involving wolves
8th century BC in the Roman Kingdom
Ancient city of Rome
Rome
Etruscan mythology
Origin myths
Roman mythology
Romulus and Remus
She-wolf (Roman mythology)